is a railway station on the Yagan Railway Aizu Kinugawa Line in the city of Nikkō, Tochigi, Japan, operated by the Yagan Railway.

Lines
Ryūōkyō Station is served by the Yagan Railway Aizu Kinugawa Line and is located 1.7 kilometers from the starting point of the line at Shin-Fujiwara Station.

Station layout
The station consists of a single side platform, serving traffic in both directions, with half of the platform located within a tunnel.

Adjacent stations

History
Ryūōkyō Station opened on October 9, 1986.

Surrounding area
 
 Ryūōkyō Gorge

External links

Yagan Railway station information 

Railway stations in Tochigi Prefecture
Railway stations in Japan opened in 1986
Nikkō, Tochigi